Palacio Municipal de Zapopan is a historic building in Zapopan, in the Mexican state of Jalisco.

References

External links
 

Buildings and structures in Jalisco
Zapopan